The Louisville, Cincinnati and Lexington Railroad was a 19th-century railway company in the U.S. state of Kentucky. It operated from 1869, when it was created from the merger of the Louisville and Frankfort and Lexington and Frankfort railroads, until 1877, when it failed and was reincorporated as the Louisville, Cincinnati and Lexington Railway. It later made up part of the L&N network and its former rights-of-way currently form parts of the class-I CSX Transportation system.

See also
 List of Kentucky railroads

Defunct Kentucky railroads
Defunct companies based in Louisville, Kentucky
Transportation in Louisville, Kentucky
Railway companies established in 1869
Railway companies disestablished in 1877
1869 establishments in Kentucky
American companies established in 1869
American companies disestablished in 1877